Sean Nahas (born April 24, 1978) is an American soccer coach and former player who is currently the head coach of North Carolina Courage of the National Women's Soccer League (NWSL).

Early life 
Nahas grew up in East Northport, New York, and played youth soccer.

College career 
Nahas played two years of collegiate soccer for Queens Royals. He later graduated from Hofstra University.

Coaching career 
Nahas directed the youth academy of North Carolina Courage since 2004; he also served as assistant and scout for various youth national teams.

In October 2021, Nahas became interim head coach of North Carolina Courage. He was elevated to the role permanently in December 2021.

References 

1978 births
Living people
National Women's Soccer League coaches
Queens Royals men's soccer players
Hofstra University alumni
Association footballers not categorized by position
Association football players not categorized by nationality
North Carolina Courage coaches
North Carolina Courage non-playing staff